Poproč is a village and municipality in the Rimavská Sobota District of the Banská Bystrica Region of southern Slovakia. In the past locals had been engaged in pasturage and livestock breeding. Together with Červeňany it is the smallest village in Banská Bystrica Region.

References

External links
 
 
A bear in the Poproč - video

Villages and municipalities in Rimavská Sobota District